Tamer Ibrahim (born July 23, 1974) is the co-founder of DropIn, Inc. an on-demand live video platform.

Early life
Ibrahim immigrated to the United States when he was 4 yrs old. As a teenager, Ibrahim dabbled in small crime, which later grew to Ecstasy.

Ecstasy Trade

Ibrahim traded Ecstasy during 1997-2000, sometimes partnering with Louis Ziskin. Ibrahim would import the drug to the United States via Europe. Ibrahim’s operation was smuggling hundreds of kilos of Ecstasy into the United States, until he became a fugitive after one of his shipments containing over 1000 pounds of Ecstasy was seized in July 2000. After seeing news of the seizure on television, Ibrahim fled to Amsterdam via Mexico, while United States authorities raided Ibrahim's Los Angeles residence, seizing $988,000 in cash, a Ferrari, Range Rover, and Porsche, and other valuables.

Ibrahim was taken in to custody in September, 2000, by Dutch authorities in Amsterdam under an international arrest warrant from the United States. Ibrahim was extradited to the United States in 2002. At the conclusion of his case, USA vs. Tamer Ibrahim (CAS-000852)  on July 26, 2004, Ibrahim was sentenced to 188 months and a $4.5 million restitution and a $4.5 million fine for Continuing Criminal Enterprise.

In 2008, Ibrahim won a writ of Coram Nobus from the 9th circuit court of appeals, which saw Ibrahim get released in April, 2010 (instead of 2014). The fines levied against Ibrahim were wiped clean due to money and property coming up missing.

DropIn
DropIn, Inc. is a remote on-demand video inspection platform that creates live video feeds of any place in the world, at any time. The service caters to the insurance and automotive industries.

Philanthropy
Ibrahim is a frequent donor to California Youth Charity for at risk youth.

References

1974 births
Living people